Roger Douglas Hudson (born 8 June 1967) is an English former cricketer.  Hudson was a right-handed batsman who bowled right-arm medium pace.  He was born at Selly Oak, Warwickshire.  He was educated at Oxford University.

Hudson made his first-class debut for Oxford University against Durham.  During the 1997 season, he represented the University in 11 first-class matches, with his final first-class appearance coming against Cambridge University.  In his 11 first-class matches, he scored 202 runs at a batting average of 11.22, with a single half century high score of 62. Hudson never took a wicket, despite bowling forty one overs, though is very capable of talking up some near misses.

In 1999, Hudson played the only List-A match of his career for Huntingdonshire in the 1999 NatWest Trophy against Bedfordshire.  In the match he scored 12 runs and a took a single catch. On this occasion the captain wisely never handed him the ball.

Hudson moved to Australia in 2001 and, perhaps fearing his cricketing powers had peaked, took up golf. Known best for long (occasionally wild) drives combined with spectacular recovery shots, Hudson relentlessly pursues his goal of a scratch handicap. His progress is meticulously monitored through a series of excel sheets, indeed there is very little in life Hudson cannot put into a spreadsheet, though perhaps his goal will shortly be changed to “shooting less than his age”.

References

External links
Roger Hudson at Cricinfo

1967 births
Living people
Cricketers from Birmingham, West Midlands
Alumni of Keble College, Oxford
English cricketers
Oxford University cricketers
Huntingdonshire cricketers
English cricketers of 1969 to 2000